Sug (typeset as SuG) was a Japanese visual kei rock band formed in 2006. The band has released two EPs, five full-length studio albums, and several singles. Until 2009, the band was signed to "Indie PSC", a subdivision of PS Company. As of 2010, they have signed onto a major label, Pony Canyon. The band's tagline in promotional work is "Heavy Positive Rock".

History
Vocalist Takeru and guitarists Masato and Yuji had previously performed in a band called Travel. After Travel disbanded, they joined with AmeriA's bassist, Shouta, to form Sug in October 2006. The drummer Mitsuru then joined in November of the same year.

Shouta left the band in February and was replaced by Chiyu on bass. Their first release was "7th Breeze" on the compilation album Cannonball Vol. 03. The band signed to the visual-kei management PS Company, and in August 2007, the band released their first single, "Scheat". Months after the release of their first single, Sug released their first EP, titled I Scream Party. To promote their music outside Japan, Sug performed at "J-Rock Invasion" in Germany alongside Kagrra, Kra, Alice Nine, and Screw—all of whom are also signed to CLJ Records, a German label.

Mitsuru left Sug after their concert on 9 May 2009. Their support drummer at the time, Shinpei, became a full-time member of the band after Mitsuru's departure.

Following the announcement of their single "Gr8 Story", Sug announced their move onto major label PS Company during the live event called "Sug Fes 2009 Alternative Pop Show: Vol.6" on 30 November 2009. "Gr8 Story" was released through Pony Canyon, and the title track was used as the ending song for the Katekyō Hitman Reborn! anime According to the band, the song is "rather punkish", yet with a catchy tune and an "easy-listening appeal".

Their second studio album and their first album through Pony Canyon, Tokyo Muzical Hotel, was released on 9 March 2010. Their third studio album and their second album through Pony Canyon, Thrill Ride Pirates, was released a year later, also on 9 March, and included two singles; "mad$hip" and "Crazy Bunny Coaster".

On 25 April 2012, the band released their third studio album, Lollipop Kingdom, which produced five singles: "Pastel Horror Yum Yum Show", "Gimme×Gimme", "Toy Soldier", "Howling Magic", and "不完全BeautyFool Days".

On 7 October 2012, Sug announced they would officially leave PSC after their performance on 29 December at Yoyogi Kyogijo Daini Taikukan, resulting in a temporary hiatus. Sug announced on 19 September 2013 that the hiatus would end in late December of that year. The band went on to release three singles, "Missing", "B.A.B.Y." and "Cry Out" over the course of 2014.

On 4 March 2015 Sug released Black, their first full-length album since the end of their hiatus. The album included three new singles in addition to the three released in 2014. On 15 July 2015, Sug released another single, "TeenAge Dream". On 11 September Sug announced that they would be going on their first full-length Europe Tour starting from 29 November, and they would tour a total of 5 countries (Germany, France, United Kingdom, Russia and Finland).

On 31 July 2017, SuG announced that it would be going on indefinite hiatus for the second time. The band's final performance occurred on 2 September 2017 at Nippon Budokan. Although officially labelled a hiatus, Takeru doubted that the band would ever resume its activities. On 20 December 2017, the band announced on its official website that it had decided to disband.

Name 
The name is then simplified to the slightly more romantic "Sug".

Members
  – Vocals
 Masato – Guitar
 Yuji – Guitar
 Chiyu – Bass
 Shinpei – Drums

Former members
  – bass (2006–2007)
 Mitsuru – drums (2006–2009)

Tours

Overseas tours
Sug 2015 Europe Tour (2015)

Details: SuG 2015 Europe Tour Official Site

Discography

Albums and EPs

Singles

Best-of albums

DVDs

DVD singles

Compilations

References

External links 
  
  
 Artist Database - Sug

Musical groups established in 2006
Japanese rock music groups
Visual kei musical groups
Pony Canyon artists